London Fashion Week (LFW) is a clothing trade show that takes place in London twice a year, in February and September. Showcasing over 250 designers to a global audience of influential media and retailers, it is one of the 'Big Four' fashion weeks, along with New York, Milan, and Paris.

History and Organisation
Organised by the British Fashion Council (BFC) for the London Development Agency with help from the Department for Business, Innovation and Skills, London Fashion Week first took place in October 1983. It currently ranks alongside New York, Paris, and Milan as one of the 'Big Four' fashion weeks. It presents itself to funders as a trade event that also attracts significant press attention and benefit to taxpayers. It states that it is attended by over 5,000 press and buyers, and has estimated orders of over £100 million. A retail-focused event, London Fashion Week Festival, takes place immediately afterwards at the same venue and is open to the general public.

On-schedule events used to take place either at the British Fashion Council's own show space, 180 Strand, or at external locations around central London.

During SS16 (shown September 2015) and AW16 (shown February 2016), British Fashion Council made the decision to host the designers' showrooms to the 'Vinyl Factory', situated at the active car park in Soho, off Brewer Street.

Following increasing numbers of anti-fur protesters, the London Fashion Week held in September 2018 was the first major fashion week to be fur-free.

Events

Live Streaming 
In spring 2010, London Fashion Week became the first of the Big four fashion weeks to offer designers showing collections on the catwalk at Somerset House the opportunity to broadcast their shows live on the Internet.

London Fashion Week Men's 
In June 2012, London introduced London Collections: Men, in addition to the collections shows in spring / summer and autumn / winter. Since its first instalment, the showcase has grown by 67% and included 77 separate designers in June 2015. 
London Collections: Men was renamed from the Autumn/Winter 2017 season as London Fashion Week Men's, to help better reflect the growing consumer focus of the event.

London Fashion Week Festival 
Following London Fashion Week each season, the 4-day London Fashion Week Festival (LFWF), formerly known as London Fashion Weekend, offers a consumer-orientated fashion week experience.

Held at The Store Studios, 180 The Strand, LFWF allows consumers to shop a curated edit of designer collections at show exclusive prices, sit front row at catwalk shows by London Fashion Week designers, get a head start on the key trends of the coming season and listen to talks by industry experts.

See also

Fashion week
List of fashion events

References

External links

London Fashion Week Official website
London Fashion Film Festival

Fashion events in England
Annual events in London
English fashion
Recurring events established in 1984
1984 establishments in England
Fashion weeks